Nisar Ahmad Jutt (born 9 March 1965) is a Pakistani politician who had been a member of the National Assembly of Pakistan, from 2002 to 2007 and again from June 2013 to May 2018.

Early life
He was born on 9 March 1965. He is an agriculturalist.

Political career
He was elected to the National Assembly of Pakistan as a candidate of Pakistan Peoples Party (PPP) from Constituency NA-81 (Faisalabad-VII) in 2002 Pakistani general election. He received 58,855 votes and defeated a candidate of Pakistan Muslim League (Q) (PML-Q). In 2008, he quit PPP and joined PML-Q.

He ran for the seat of the National Assembly as a candidate of PML-Q from Constituency NA-81 (Faisalabad-VII) in 2008 Pakistani general election but was unsuccessful. He received 55,646 votes and lost the seat to Chaudhry Saeed Iqbal, a candidate of PPP. In 2013, he quit PML-Q and joined Pakistan Muslim League (N) (PML-N).

He was re-elected to the National Assembly as a candidate of PML-N from Constituency NA-81 (Faisalabad-VII) in 2013 Pakistani general election. He received 122,059 votes and defeated Chaudhry Saeed Iqbal.

In October 2017, he was appointed as Federal Parliamentary Secretary for Human Rights.

He announced to resign from his National Assembly seat in protest in December 2017. In March 2018, he quit PML-N and joined Pakistan Tehreek-e-Insaf (PTI).

References

Living people
1975 births
Pakistani MNAs 2002–2007
Pakistani MNAs 2013–2018
Pakistan People's Party MNAs
Pakistan Muslim League (N) MNAs
Politicians from Faisalabad